Vök are an Icelandic dream pop and indietronic band from Reykjavík. The band was formed in January 2013 by singer Margrét Magnúsdóttir and saxophonist Andri Enoksson after two years of working together. The name "Vök" was suggested by Enoksson. In March that year, the band performed at and won Músíktilraunir, an annual music contest in Iceland. In mid-2013, Vök was joined by guitarist Ólafur Ólafsson. As of March 2019, the band's line-up consists of Margrét, Einar Stefánsson and Bergur Dagbjartsson.

Discography

Albums

Extended plays

Singles

Band members

Current members 
 Margrét Rán Magnúsdóttir – lead vocals, keyboard, guitar, synthesiser (2013–present)
 Einar Hrafn Stefánsson – guitar, bass guitar (2013-present)
 Bergur Einar Dagbjartsson – drums, percussion (2019–present)

Touring members 
 Jón Valur Guðmundsson – percussion (2014–2015)
 Guðrún Veturliðadóttir – guitar, bass guitar (2018)

Past members 
 Andri Már Enoksson – saxophone (2013–2019)
 Ólafur Alexander Ólafsson – guitar, bass guitar (2013–2018)

References 

Dream pop musical groups
Icelandic electronic music groups
Icelandic indie pop groups
Musical groups from Reykjavík
Musical groups established in 2013
2013 establishments in Iceland